Paul Bleiß (6 November 1904 – 17 April 1996) was a German politician of the Social Democratic Party (SPD) and former member of the German Bundestag.

Life 
He was a member of the German Bundestag from the 1949 to 1965 federal elections. From 1957 to 1965 he was chairman of the Bundestag Committee on Transport, Post and Telecommunications. Between 1949 and 1961 he was always directly elected to parliament in the Minden-Lübbecke I constituency.

Literature

References

1904 births
1996 deaths
Members of the Bundestag for North Rhine-Westphalia
Members of the Bundestag 1961–1965
Members of the Bundestag 1957–1961
Members of the Bundestag 1953–1957
Members of the Bundestag 1949–1953
Members of the Bundestag for the Social Democratic Party of Germany